Martin Stenzel (born 18 July 1946) is a former German cyclist. He competed in the men's tandem at the 1968 Summer Olympics.

References

1946 births
Living people
German male cyclists
Olympic cyclists of West Germany
Cyclists at the 1968 Summer Olympics
People from Lądek-Zdrój
Sportspeople from Lower Silesian Voivodeship
Cyclists from Cologne